Global warming potential (GWP) is the heat absorbed by any greenhouse gas in the atmosphere, as a multiple of the heat that would be absorbed by the same mass of carbon dioxide. For other gases it depends on the gas and the time frame.

Carbon dioxide equivalent (e or eq or -e) is calculated from GWP. For any gas, it is the mass of  that would warm the earth as much as the mass of that gas. Thus it provides a common scale for measuring the climate effects of different gases. It is calculated as GWP times mass of the other gas. 

Methane has GWP (over 100 years) of 27.9 meaning that, for example, a leak of a tonne of methane is equivalent to emitting 27.9 tonnes of carbon dioxide. Similarly a tonne of nitrous oxide, from manure for example, is equivalent to 273 tonnes of carbon dioxide.

Values 
Carbon dioxide is the reference. It has a GWP of 1 regardless of the time period used.  emissions cause increases in atmospheric concentrations of  that will last thousands of years.
Estimates of GWP values over 20, 100 and 500 years are periodically compiled and revised in reports from the Intergovernmental Panel on Climate Change:

 SAR (1995)
 TAR (2001)
 AR4 (2007)
 AR5 (2013)
 AR6 (2021)

Though recent reports reflect more scientific accuracy, countries and companies continue to use SAR and AR4 values for reasons of comparison in their emission reports. AR5 has skipped 500 year values but introduced GWP estimations including the climate-carbon feedback (f) with a large amount of uncertainty.

The IPCC lists many other substances not shown here. Some have high GWP but only a low concentration in the atmosphere. The total impact of all fluorinated gases is estimated at 3% of all greenhouse gas emissions.

The values given in the table assume the same mass of compound is analyzed; different ratios will result from the conversion of one substance to another. For instance, burning methane to carbon dioxide would reduce the global warming impact, but by a smaller factor than 25:1 because the mass of methane burned is less than the mass of carbon dioxide released (ratio 1:2.74). This is a net reduction of 22.26 tonnes of GWP, reducing the global warming effect by a ratio of 25:2.74 (approximately 9 times).

Use in Kyoto Protocol and UNFCCC 
Under the Kyoto Protocol, in 1997 the Conference of the Parties standardized international reporting, by deciding (decision 2/CP.3) that the values of GWP calculated for the IPCC Second Assessment Report were to be used for converting the various greenhouse gas emissions into comparable  equivalents.

After some intermediate updates, in 2013 this standard was updated by the Warsaw meeting of the UN Framework Convention on Climate Change (UNFCCC, decision 24/CP.19) to require using a new set of 100-year GWP values. They published these values in Annex III, and they took them from the 4th Assessment Report of the Intergovernmental Panel on Climate Change, which had been published in 2007.

Those 2007 estimates are still used for international comparisons through 2020, although the latest research on warming effects has found other values, as shown in the table above.

Importance of time horizon 
A substance's GWP depends on the number of years (denoted by a subscript) over which the potential is calculated. A gas which is quickly removed from the atmosphere may initially have a large effect, but for longer time periods, as it has been removed, it becomes less important. Thus methane has a potential of 25 over 100 years (GWP100 = 25) but 86 over 20 years (GWP20 = 86); conversely sulfur hexafluoride has a GWP of 22,800 over 100 years but 16,300 over 20 years (IPCC Third Assessment Report). The GWP value depends on how the gas concentration decays over time in the atmosphere. This is often not precisely known and hence the values should not be considered exact. For this reason when quoting a GWP it is important to give a reference to the calculation.

The GWP for a mixture of gases can be obtained from the mass-fraction-weighted average of the GWPs of the individual gases.

Commonly, a time horizon of 100 years is used by regulators.

Water vapour 

Water vapour does contribute to anthropogenic global warming, but as the GWP is defined, it is negligible for H2O.

Its concentration in the atmosphere is limited by air temperature, so that radiative forcing by water vapour increases with global warming (positive feedback). But the GWP definition excludes indirect effects. GWP definition is also based on emissions, and anthropogenic emissions of water vapour (cooling towers, irrigation) are removed via precipitation within weeks, so its GWP is negligible.

Criticism and other metrics 

The Global Temperature change Potential (GTP) is another way to compare gases. While GWP estimates heat absorbed, GTP estimates the resulting rise in average surface temperature of the world, over the next 20, 50 or 100 years, caused by a greenhouse gas, relative to the temperature rise which the same mass of  would cause.
Calculation of GTP requires modeling how the world, especially the oceans, will absorb heat.
GTP is published in the same IPCC tables with GWP.

Calculating the global warming potential 

The GWP depends on the following factors:
 the absorption of infrared radiation by a given gas
 the time horizon of interest (integration period)
 the atmospheric lifetime of the gas
A high GWP correlates with a large infrared absorption and a long atmospheric lifetime.  The dependence of GWP on the wavelength of absorption is more complicated. Even if a gas absorbs radiation efficiently at a certain wavelength, this may not affect its GWP much if the atmosphere already absorbs most radiation at that wavelength. A gas has the most effect if it absorbs in a "window" of wavelengths where the atmosphere is fairly transparent. The dependence of GWP as a function of wavelength has been found empirically and published as a graph.

Because the GWP of a greenhouse gas depends directly on its infrared spectrum, the use of infrared spectroscopy to study greenhouse gases is centrally important in the effort to understand the impact of human activities on global climate change.

Just as radiative forcing provides a simplified means of comparing the various factors that are believed to influence the climate system to one another, global warming potentials (GWPs) are one type of simplified index based upon radiative properties that can be used to estimate the potential future impacts of emissions of different gases upon the climate system in a relative sense. GWP is based on a number of factors, including the radiative efficiency (infrared-absorbing ability) of each gas relative to that of carbon dioxide, as well as the decay rate of each gas (the amount removed from the atmosphere over a given number of years) relative to that of carbon dioxide.

The radiative forcing capacity (RF) is the amount of energy per unit area, per unit time, absorbed by the greenhouse gas, that would otherwise be lost to space.  It can be expressed by the formula:

where the subscript i represents an interval of 10 inverse centimeters.  Absi represents the integrated infrared absorbance of the sample in that interval, and Fi represents the RF for that interval.

The Intergovernmental Panel on Climate Change (IPCC) provides the generally accepted values for GWP, which changed slightly between 1996 and 2001. An exact definition of how GWP is calculated is to be found in the IPCC's 2001 Third Assessment Report. The GWP is defined as the ratio of the time-integrated radiative forcing from the instantaneous release of 1 kg of a trace substance relative to that of 1 kg of a reference gas:

where TH is the time horizon over which the calculation is considered; ax is the radiative efficiency due to a unit increase in atmospheric abundance of the substance (i.e., Wm−2 kg−1) and [x](t) is the time-dependent decay in abundance of the substance following an instantaneous release of it at time t=0. The denominator contains the corresponding quantities for the reference gas (i.e. ). The radiative efficiencies ax and ar are not necessarily constant over time. While the absorption of infrared radiation by many greenhouse gases varies linearly with their abundance, a few important ones display non-linear behaviour for current and likely future abundances (e.g., CH4, and N2O). For those gases, the relative radiative forcing will depend upon abundance and hence upon the future scenario adopted.

Assuming otherwise as is done above will lead to lower GWPs for other gases than a more detailed approach would.

Carbon dioxide equivalent

Carbon dioxide equivalent (e or eq or -e) of a quantity of gas is calculated from its GWP. Thus it provides a common scale for measuring the climate effects of different gases. It is calculated as GWP multiplied by mass of the other gas. For example, if a gas has GWP of 100, two tonnes of the gas have e of 200 tonnes, and 9 tonnes of the gas has e of 900 tonnes.

For example, e of 500 parts per million would reflect a mix of atmospheric gases which warm the earth as much as 500 parts per million of  would warm it.

e calculations depend on the time-scale chosen, typically 100 years or 20 years,
since gases decay in the atmosphere or are absorbed naturally, at different rates.

The following units are commonly used:
By the UN climate change panel (IPCC): billion metric tonnes = n×109 tonnes of  equivalent (Gteq)
In industry: million metric tonnes of carbon dioxide equivalents (MMTCDE) and MMT eq.
For vehicles: grams of carbon dioxide equivalent per mile (ge/mile) or per kilometer (ge/km)

For example, the table above shows GWP for methane over 20 years at 86 and nitrous oxide at 289, so emissions of 1 million tonnes of methane or nitrous oxide are equivalent to emissions of 86 or 289 million tonnes of carbon dioxide, respectively.

See also 

Carbon accounting
Carbon footprint
Emission intensity
List of refrigerants
Radiative forcing
Total equivalent warming impact
Vehicle emission standard

References

Notes

Sources

IPCC reports

Other sources

External links 
 List of Global Warming Potentials and Atmospheric Lifetimes from the U.S. EPA
 GWP and the different meanings of e explained

Bibliography
 

Greenhouse gas emissions
Climate forcing
Infrared spectroscopy
Carbon dioxide
Equivalent units